Jannatabadqom (also Romanized as Jannatābādqom) is a village in the Central District of Qom County, Qom Province, Iran.

References 

Populated places in Qom Province